Colonel Sir Edward Geoffrey Hippisley-Cox  (29 August 1884 – 24 February 1954) was a British Army officer and parliamentary agent.

He was honorary colonel of the Queen's Westminsters. In 1928, he bought Gournay Court in West Harptree, Somerset.

References 

1884 births
1954 deaths
Queen's Westminsters officers
Commanders of the Order of the British Empire
Knights Bachelor
Deputy Lieutenants of Somerset
British Army personnel of World War I
British Army personnel of World War II